Cointreau is a brand of orange-flavoured triple sec liqueur produced in Saint-Barthélemy-d'Anjou, France. It is consumed as an apéritif and digestif, and is a component of several well-known cocktails. It was originally called Curaçao Blanco Triple Sec. Despite the orange bottle, Cointreau is colourless.

Production 
Cointreau Distillery was set up in 1849 by Adolphe Cointreau, a confectioner, and his brother Edouard-Jean Cointreau. Their first success was with the cherry liqueur Guignolet, but they also found success when they blended sweet and bitter orange peels and pure alcohol from sugar beets. The first bottles of Cointreau were sold in 1875. An estimated 13 million bottles are sold each year, in more than 150 countries. Ninety percent of production is exported. Cointreau & Cie SA was family-owned until 1990, when it merged with Rémy Martin to form Rémy Cointreau, now a publicly traded company.

The production methods and recipe are a family secret, but tours of the facility are open to the public. Photography is restricted in many areas to protect the production process from being copied.

Cocktails 
In addition to being consumed neat (or often on ice), Cointreau is used in many popular cocktails.
The official IBA recipes for the margarita, Corpse Reviver #2, and the cosmopolitan include Cointreau. When mixed with water, Cointreau exhibits the Ouzo effect.

Publicity 
In the 1980s, Avirex, now Cockpit USA, issued an A-2 limited-edition leather flight jacket featuring Cointreau Original Margarita nose art on the back of the jacket. In early 2008, burlesque entertainer Dita Von Teese became the new face of Cointreau's "Be Cointreauversial" advertising and marketing campaign, a campaign created in 2003 by the New York advertising agency KraftWorks.

See also 
 Grand Marnier

References

External links 
 
 Rémy Cointreau

Products introduced in 1875
French liqueurs
Orange liqueurs